Robley Henry Rex (May 2, 1901 – April 28, 2009) was a World War I-era veteran and was, at the age of 107, one of two remaining U.S. veterans related to the First World War.

Rex was born in Hopkinsville, Kentucky and enlisted in the military in May, 1919, six months after the Armistice date. He was the last Kentucky World War I era veteran, and the last known World War I era veteran of the United States. He served in the Intelligence Unit.

He enlisted in the 5th Infantry Division and later served in the 28th Infantry Division.  He trained at Camp Zachary Taylor, Kentucky, and Fort Meade, Maryland, before he was deployed to Europe, where there was still a strong military presence, in order to restabilize Europe post-war. While overseas he served in Andernach, and Coblenz, Germany. After being discharged from the Army with the rank of Private First Class in August 1922, Rex returned to Louisville, Kentucky, where he became a postal worker and an ordained Methodist minister.

Rex met his future wife Gracie at Louisville's Camp Taylor before he was sent to Europe. They married in 1922 but never had children. She died in 1992.

In 1986, Rex turned to volunteerism, lending support to fellow veterans at the Louisville Veteran's Administration Medical Center. Rex logged more than 14,000 hours of volunteer time while at the Center. He continued to volunteer there three days a week, even at age 105. For his 107th birthday, Rex was presented the Kentucky Governor's Award for Outstanding Volunteer Service. He was also honored in 2005 by the national Veterans of Foreign Wars as National Volunteer of the Year.

Rex died at the Louisville V.A. Medical Center, four days before his 108th birthday. His family requested a private funeral. He was buried on May 6, 2009 at Zachary Taylor National Cemetery.
The Louisville V.A. Medical Center was renamed the Robley Rex V.A. Medical Center in his honor in April 2010.

Upon Rex's death, Frank Buckles (who had actually served in World War I prior to the armistice) became the last surviving United States World War I-era veteran.

See also

List of last living war veterans
Last surviving United States war veterans
List of last surviving World War I veterans by country
List of last surviving World War I veterans

References

External links
 The Times Leader Online report on Robley Rex's death
 Robley Henry Rex Collection (AFC/2001/001/63835), Veterans History Project, American Folklife Center, Library of Congress

1901 births
2009 deaths
American centenarians
Men centenarians
People from Hopkinsville, Kentucky
Military personnel from Louisville, Kentucky
United States Army soldiers
American Methodist clergy
20th-century American clergy